Out of Luck is a 2015 Nigerian drama thriller film written by Chinaza Onuzo and directed by Niyi Akinmolayan. It stars Tope Tedela, Linda Ejiofor, Femi Branch, Adesua Etomi, Sambasa Nzeribe, Wole Ojo with cameo appearances by Jide Kosoko and Chigul. It was released on 4 December 2015.

Cast
Tope Tedela as Dayo
Linda Ejiofor as Halima
Femi Branch as Innocent
Jide Kosoko
Adeniyi Johnson as Yinka
Adesua Etomi as Bisola
Wole Ojo as Seun
Sambasa Nzeribe as Tanimu
Bolaji Ogunmola
Chigul
Kunle Remi

Production
In October 2015, a full length trailer was released for the film.

References

External links
 

Nigerian thriller drama films
Films set in Lagos
Films shot in Lagos
2015 films
2015 thriller drama films
2015 drama films
English-language Nigerian films
2010s English-language films